Keshvari Expressway is an expressway in Esfahan, Iran. This expressway connects southern entrance of the city to Avini Street.

Streets in Isfahan